Francis Hopkinson Smith (October 23, 1838 – April 7, 1915) was an American author, artist and engineer. He built the foundation for the Statue of Liberty, wrote many stories and received awards for his paintings.

F. Hopkinson Smith was the great uncle of American architect, author and photographer G. E. Kidder Smith (1913-1997).

Biography

Smith was born in Baltimore, Maryland on October 23, 1838, a descendant of Francis Hopkinson, one of the signers of the Declaration of Independence. He graduated from the Boys' Latin School of Maryland.

Smith became a contractor in New York City and did much work for the federal government, including the stone ice-breaker at Bridgeport, Connecticut, the jetties at the mouth of the Connecticut River, the foundation for the Bartholdi Statue of Liberty in New York Harbor, the Race Rock Lighthouse (southwest of Fishers Island, New York) and many life-saving stations. His vacations were spent sketching in the White Mountains, in Cuba and in Mexico. He also visited and sketched in Venice, Constantinople and the Netherlands.

He married Josephine Van Deventer on April 26, 1866.

His first popular book was Col. Carter of Cartersville (1891). His 1896 novel Tom Grogan and 1898 novel Caleb West were each the best selling book in the United States in the year of their release.

On March 1, 1915, Smith wrote the Carmel Arts and Crafts Club in Carmel-by-the-Sea, California about his collection of fifteen original paintings being sent for a exhibition at the Club on June 8 to June 26, 1915. It was his first venture out West.

He died at his home in New York City on April 7, 1915.

Selected bibliography
He illustrated and published numerous travelogues, including:
Old Lines in New Black and White (1885)
Well-Worn Roads (1886)
A White Umbrella in Mexico (1889)
Gondola Days (1897)
The Venice of To-Day (1897)
His novels and short stories are especially felicitous in their portrayal of the Old South. Among them are:
Col. Carter of Cartersville (1891), which was successfully dramatized
A Day at La Guerre's and other Days (1892)
A Gentleman Vagabond and Some Others (1895)(short stories)
Tom Grogan (1896)
Caleb West (1898)
The Other Fellow (1899) (short story collection, including "A Kentucky Cinderella" which was adapted to film in 1917 and 1921)
The Fortunes of Oliver Horn (1902), which has reminiscences of his artist friends
The Under Dog (1903) (collection of 13 short stories)
Col. Carter's Christmas (1904)
At Close Range (1905)
The Tides of Barnegat (1906)
The Veiled Lady (1907)
The Romance of an Old Fashioned Gentleman (1907)
Peter (1908)
Forty Minutes Late and Other Stories (1909)
Kennedy Square (1911)
 The Arm-chair at The Inn (Charles Scribner's Sons) (1912)
 In Thackeray's London: Pictures and Text (Doubleday, Page & Co.) (1913)
 In Dickens' London (1914).
 Felix O'Day (1915)
 Enoch Crane (1916) (completed by F. Berkeley Smith)

Selected filmography
Kennedy Square, directed by S. Rankin Drew (1916, based on the novel Kennedy Square)
The Tides of Barnegat, directed by Marshall Neilan (1917, based on the novel The Tides of Barnegat)
A Kentucky Cinderella, directed by Rupert Julian (1917, based on the short story A Kentucky Cinderella)
Felix O'Day, directed by Robert Thornby (1920, based on the novel Felix O'Day)
Deep Waters, directed by Maurice Tourneur (1920, based on the novel Caleb West)

References

Attribution:

External links 

 
 
 
 
Francis Hopkinson Smith exhibition catalogs
Artwork by Francis Hopkinson Smith

1838 births
1915 deaths
19th-century American novelists
20th-century American novelists
American male novelists
19th-century American painters
19th-century American male artists
American male painters
20th-century American painters
19th-century American male writers
20th-century American male writers
American civil engineers
20th-century American male artists